better known by her ring name Itsuki Aoki is a Japanese professional wrestler currently working as a freelancer and is best known for her time in the Japanese promotions Oz Academy and Pro Wrestling Wave.

Professional wrestling career

Independent circuit (2017-present)
As a freelancer, Aoki worked for various promotions. At AJPW Starting Over 2017 on November 6, she wrestled in two times, teaming up with Rina Yamashita in a losing effort to Saori Anou and Fairy Nihonbashi. They challenged them to an immediate rematch which they won. At ZERO1 Goen No Kuni Shimane Tour 2018 Masuda Convention, an event promoted by Pro Wrestling Zero1 on November 11, 2018, she fell short to Hiroyo Matsumoto. At BJW Osaka Surprise 40 ~ Thanksgiving Day 2018, an event promoted by Big Japan Pro Wrestling on December 23, 2018, she teamed up with Akino in a losing effort to Drake Morimatsu and Kaori Yoneyama. At SEAdLINNNG Grow Together!, an event promoted by Seadlinnng on November 4, 2020, Aoki teamed up with Ryo Mizunami as "Max Voltage" and Rina Yamashita in a losing effort to Las Fresa de Egoistas (Asuka and Makoto) and Saki Akai as a result of a six-woman tag team match.

Ice Ribbon (2018-present)
Aoki is also a part of Ice Ribbon's roster. At RibbonMania 2019 on December 31, she competed in a 44-person gauntlet match also involving Ken Ohka, Munenori Sawa, Hiragi Kurumi, Tsukushi, Syuri, Manami Toyota, Tsukasa Fujimoto and others. At Ice Ribbon New Ice Ribbon #1105 on March 20, 2021, Aoki teamed up with Satsuki Totoro to unsuccessfully challenge Rebel X Enemy (Maika Ozaki and Maya Yukihi) for the International Ribbon Tag Team Championship. At Ice Ribbon New Ice Ribbon #1100 on February 20, 2021 she unsuccessfully challenged Risa Sera for the FantastICE Championship.

Pro Wrestling Wave (2018-present)
Aoki made her debut in Pro Wrestling Wave at WAVE Osaka Rhapsody Vol. 40 on May 19, 2018 where she unsuccessfully challenged Cherry. At Kabuki-cho Week Ender on January 16, 2021, Aoki teamed up with Rin Kadokura to defeat Boss to Mammy (Mio Momono and Yumi Ohka) for the Wave Tag Team Championship. At WAVE NAMI 1 on January 1, 2021, Aoki competed in an 11-woman battle royal also involving Kaori Yoneyama, Saki, Yuki Miyazaki and others.

She is known for competing in various of the promotion's signature events. One of them is Catch the Wave, making her first appearance at the 2021 edition of the event, placing herself in the Gatling Block and scoring a total of two points after going against Nagisa Nozaki, Saki and Yuu.

Oz Academy (2018-present)
Aoki made her debut in Oz Academy on May 4, 2018 at a house show where she competed in a battle royal also involving Sareee, Sonoko Kato, Alex Lee and others. At OZ Academy Come Back To Shima! on May 25, 2019, she won a battle royal also involving Himeka Arita, Hikari Shimizu, Kakeru Sekiguchi and others. At OZ Academy The Fortress on July 11, 2021, Aoki unsuccessfully challenged Kaori Yoneyama for the Oz Academy Openweight Championship.

Championships and accomplishments
Oz Academy
Oz Academy Tag Team Championship (1 time) – with Tsubasa Kuragaki
Pro Wrestling Wave
Wave Tag Team Championship (1 time) – with Rin Kadokura
Marvelous That's Women Pro Wrestling
AAAW Tag Team Championship (1 time) with Rin Kadokura

References 

1997 births
Living people
Japanese female professional wrestlers
People from Shimane Prefecture
21st-century professional wrestlers
Oz Academy Tag Team Champions
AAAW Tag Team Champions